Caue Fernandes Silveira (born July 31, 1988 in Santana do Livramento) is a Brazilian footballer currently playing for CD Marathón of the Liga Nacional de Fútbol Profesional de Honduras.

Honours and awards

Club
C.D. Marathón
Honduran Cup: 2017
Honduran Supercup: 2019

References

External links
 Profile at BDFA 
 
 Profile at Tenfield Digital 

1988 births
Living people
Sportspeople from Rio Grande do Sul
Association football defenders
Brazilian footballers
Brazilian expatriate footballers
Uruguayan Primera División players
Juventud de Las Piedras players
El Tanque Sisley players
Club Nacional de Football players
Liverpool F.C. (Montevideo) players
Expatriate footballers in Uruguay